Jonathan Leonel Techera Saldaña (born November 20, 1989 in Montevideo) is a Uruguayan footballer who currently plays as a striker for Club Deportivo Marathon in Honduras, Central America.

Teams
  Defensor Sporting 2009
  Cerro Largo 2010
  Lustenau 2010
  Sud América 2011-2013
 Club Deportivo Marathon 2013-present

External links

1989 births
Living people
Footballers from Montevideo
Uruguayan footballers
Uruguayan expatriate footballers
Defensor Sporting players
Cerro Largo F.C. players
Sud América players
FC Lustenau players
Expatriate footballers in Austria
Association football forwards